Gerardo De Oscar y Araujo (Born 5 February 1978) is an Uruguayan writer, essayist and theologian. Self-taught in humanist disciplines, he has written both stories and essays. His works are rich in narrative and dimensional parallel imaginary landscapes, as well as an interesting range of characters devoid of morals including true antiheroes, intense and willing to live dangerously. In creation, Oscar formed a non-existent universe, abstract and relative. His essays address such diverse topics as love, the nature of the human race, politics, history, anthropology and theology, the latter being what most haunted him. His studies enabled him to write Islamic anthropology essays on the Koran, the Sunna, and other topics of theological Islamic sciences. He resides in Chile where he is dedicated to cultural and literary pursuits.

Works

Snake Head and Other Tales (2009)
Essay on racial anthropology (2004)
Alif, Lam, Mim (2007)
The eloquent gesture

References 
Revista Estètica - Gerardo De Oscar editor literario 
El Gesto Elocuente

External links
Sean los orientales
Progresismo en Chile
La elocuencia de los gestos

Uruguayan male writers
1978 births
Living people